This article lists the many extinct states, countries, nations, empires or territories from Ancient History to just before the Early Modern period, grouped geographically.  For the purposes of this list, the Early Modern period begins at the Fall of Constantinople in 1453.  For earlier civilizations, see prehistory.

Europe, North Africa and the Near East

Ancient

Achaean League (280–146 BCE)
Adiabene (15–116 CE)
Aetolian League (367–189 BCE)
Akkadian Empire
Alamanni
Ammon (10th century BCE-332 BCE)
Kingdom of Hatra
Kingdom of Armenia
Assyria
Neo-Assyrian Empire
Atropatene
Avar Kingdom
Axumite Kingdom
Babylonia
Neo-Babylonian Empire
Bithynia
Bosporan Kingdom
Kingdoms of Sub-Roman Britain
Burgundian Kingdom
Cappadocia
Caucasian Iberia
Carthage
Chaldea
Characene
Commagene
Colchis
Cyrene
Dacia
Delian League (Athenian Empire, 478 BC-404 BC)
Edom
Egrisi
Egyptian Empire
Elam
Elymais
Ancient Epirus
Etruria
Fatimid Caliphate
Finnveden
Kingdom of the Franks
Frisian kingdom
Galatia
Gallic Empire
Gepid Kingdom
Ghassanid Kingdom
Gordyene
Greco-Bactrian Kingdom
Hellenic city-states (such as Athens, Sparta, Syracuse) and their allied cities/colonies/territories. See List of ancient Greek cities for all Greek Poleis.
Hellenistic Empires (Ptolemaic, Seleucid, Antigonid, etc.)
Himyar
Hittites
Hunnic Empire
Hurrians
Illyria
Hebrew kingdoms of Israel and Judah, and later kingdom of Judaea
Kindah
Kush
Lakhmids
Lombard Kingdoms
Lycia
Lydia
Macedon
Mauritania
Media
Meroe
Moab
Nabataean kingdom
Nekor
Njudung
The petty kingdoms of present-day Norway
Nubia
Numidian Kingdom
Saxons
Odrysian kingdom of Thrace
Osroene
Ostrogothic Kingdom
Kingdom of Pergamon
Palmyra
Parthia
Philistines
Phoenician city states
Kingdom of Pontus
Rome
Roman Kingdom
Roman Republic
Roman Empire
Rugiland
Scythia
Domain of Soissons
Suebic Kingdom
Sumerian city states
Tartessos
Thuringia
Urartu
Värend
Vasconia
Visigothic Kingdom
Yamkhad
Yemeni Kingdoms
qataban
hadramaut
Sabaeans
Minaeans
Troy

There were also numerous Celtic, Germanic, and Slavic Tribes.

Medieval

England
After the collapse of the Roman Empire, the Romano-British territories became increasingly fragmented.  This was a result of the traditional system of Celtic inheritance: the realm was split amongst all sons upon a king's death.  This situation was made worse after c. 449 when Jutes and Anglo-Saxons began colonising the south-eastern seaboards.  As Jutes and Anglo-Saxons drove further inland, remaining Celts fled to the far corners of the island.  Eventually the Romano-Britons (now known to the Anglo-Saxons as "Welsh") were assimilated or driven into the highlands of Cambria (Wales) or Caledonia (Scotland).

Sub-Roman Brythonic kingdoms in England
Dumnonia, a realm named after the Dumnonii in the southwest.
Kingdom of Cornwall, ca. 720–870, rump state after the fall of Dumnonia to Wessex.
Bryneich, a hypothesised kingdom in the modern-day northeast of England. The region is also thought to have been a part of Gododdin.
Ebrauc, a small kingdom centred on York.
Calchfynedd, a kingdom in the Chiltern or Cheviot Hills.
Elmet, a substantial kingdom near Leeds extinguished in 616.
Rheged, another substantial kingdom, divided into north and south, in the northwest of modern England.
Pengwern, a significant kingdom in what is now Shropshire.

Anglo-Saxon kingdoms in England
Northumbria, formed out of the two northern Anglian kingdoms:
Beornice or Bernicia, a small kingdom comprising the northern part of Northumbria.
Dere or Deira, a small kingdom comprising the southern part of Northumbria.
Mercia, which absorbed the smaller kingdoms of Lindsey and Hwicce.
East Anglia.
Kent.
Sussex, kingdom of the South Saxons.
Wessex, kingdom of the West Saxons.
Essex, kingdom of the East Saxons.
Haestingas, a Saxon tribe in part of Sussex.
Magonsaete, an Anglian tribe in the hills of Shropshire.
Hwicce, an Anglian tribe in modern Gloucestershire and Worcestershire.
Middle Saxons, a Saxon tribe in modern Middlesex and Hertfordshire.
Suthrege, the Saxons of modern Surrey.
Hicca, a small Middle Angle tribe in modern Cambridgeshire.
Wreoconsaete, an Anglian tribe in the hills of Shropshire.
Gyre, a small Middle Angle tribe in modern Cambridgeshire.
Witware, the Jutes of the Isle of Wight.

Kingdom of England

Wales
Sub-Roman and Medieval Brythonic kingdoms in Wales
Wales experienced a similar history during this time, although the Welsh population successfully resisted the influx of Anglo-Saxon settlers into the British Isles. The country was home to a number of princedoms until England's ultimate conquest of the region in the later medieval period.

Kingdom of Gwynedd, a kingdom that eventually became the core of the Principality of Wales
Dyfed
Deheubarth
Powys
Brycheiniog, became modern Brecknockshire
Ceredigion
Gwent
Morgannwg, became modern Glamorgan
Gwerthyrnion
Meirionnydd, became modern Merionethshire
Seisyllwg
Rhufoniog
Rhos
Dogfeiling
Dunoting
Maelienydd
Principality of Wales a feudal confederation of Welsh principalities and a vassal of England between 1267 and 1282.

Scotland
Sub-Roman Cumbric kingdoms in Scotland
Valentia, an entity between Hadrians Wall and the Antonine Wall during the period following the departure of the Romans until c. 450.
Alt Clud (Strathclyde), also known as the "Kingdom of the Rock" referring to the stronghold of Dumbarton Rock in the Firth of Clyde
Gododdin
Manau Gododdin

Pictish kingdoms in Scotland
Cait — situated in modern Caithness and Sutherland
Ce — situated in modern Mar and Buchan
Circinn — perhaps situated in modern Angus and the Mearns[37]
Fib — the modern Fife, known to this day as 'the Kingdom of Fife'
Fidach — location unknown
Fotla — modern Atholl (Ath-Fotla)[38]
Fortriu — cognate with the Verturiones of the Romans; recently shown to be centered around Moray

Gaelic kingdoms in Scotland
Dál Riata, the proto-state that became Scotland. (this kingdom spanned western Scotland and northeastern Ireland)

Other
Kingdom of Scotland

Ireland
Extinct kingdoms in Ireland
Ireland during the early medieval period consisted of some two hundred tuathas or minor kingdoms, which were in turn vassals of the rulers of an over-kingdom, called a cóiced (usually translated as a portion, a fifth, or a province). The most prominent of these kingdoms were

 Aileach – later Tír Conaill and Tír Eógain
 Airgíalla
 Ulaid
 Mide
 Laighin
 Osraighe
 Munster – including Ormond, Desmond and Thomond
 Uí Maine
 Connacht

Between the 8th and 12th centuries, various Ard Rí attempted unsuccessfully to impose their rule over all the kingdoms in Ireland. Among those whose efforts almost made this a reality were Flann Sinna, reigned 877–916); Niall Glúndub mac Áedo (916–919); Brian Bóruma mac Cennétig (1002–1014); Toirdhealbhach Ua Briain (1055–1086; and Toirdhealbhach Ua Conchobhair (1119–1156). The last of these kingdoms ceased to exist in the early 17th century. Further Irish kingdoms included:

Aidhne
Breifne
Dál Fiatach
Dál nAraidi
Dál Riata (this kingdom spanned western Scotland and northeastern Ireland)
Desmond
Dublin
Fir Manach
Meath
Moylurg
Uí Failghe

For further information see Irish kings.

France
Frankish Kingdom/Carolingian Empire (~419–843)
West Francia, which eventually developed into the Kingdom of France
 Visigothic Kingdom of Tolosa, encompassing southwestern France (418–507)
Central Francia
Kingdom of Lotharingia (855–869)
Duchy of Lorraine
Duchy of Burgundy (880–1482), dynastic pivot – in personal union – of most of the Low Countries and much of eastern and northern France
Duchy of Brittany (841 to 1532)
Papal states of
Avignon
Peñíscola under antipope Benedict XIII
Republic of St. Tropez (1470–1672)
Duchy of Normandy – this state technically continues to exist as the Bailiwicks of Jersey and Guernsey, British crown dependencies not a part of the United Kingdom, while the rest was incorporated into France.
Duchy of Bar

Low Countries
in the Low Countries (present Belgium and/or Netherlands, but not Luxembourg)
Seventeen Provinces was transformed
Batavian Republic
Countship of Flanders
Duchy of Gelre (roughly Guelders), another claimant to archducal rank
Countship of Holland
Duchy of Bouillon
Countship of Namur
Drenthe
Prince-bishopric of Liège
Duchy of Brabant, claiming the rank of archduchy as premier principality in the former duchy of Lower Lotharingia
Countship of Hainaut (its personal union with Holland was not a state as such)
Countship of Hoorn
Breda
Bergen op Zoom
Arkel
Thorn
Montfoort
Friesland (Frisia)
Groningen
Oostergo
Westergo
Gemert
Woerden
Prince-bishopric of Utrecht
Countship of Zutphen

Germany and neighbouring countries
in historic and present-day Germany and neighbouring countries/regions
East Francia
Holy Roman Empire (843–1806)
List of states in the Holy Roman Empire, nearly all of those (largely Kleinstaaterei) were merged into larger states, eventually into modern Germany, Austria, and other large modern states, remarkable exceptions including Liechtenstein and Luxembourg
Pomerania ruled by the Dukes of Pomerania (1121–1637)
Monastic State of the Teutonic Knights
Great Moravia

Spain and Portugal

Iberian states
Christian Hispania
Crown of Aragon (−1716)
Aragon (1035–1479)
Ribagorza
Sobrarbe
Principality of Catalonia
Countship of Barcelona (801–1162)
Urgell
Pallars Sobirà
Pallars Jussà
Empúries
Kingdom of Valencia
Kingdom of Majorca
Kingdom of Asturias (716–913) afterwards
Kingdom of León (913–1037, 1195–1230)
Kingdom/County of Galicia
Kingdom of Galicia and Portugal
County of Portugal (Portucale, in old Portuguese)
County of Coimbra
Kingdom of Castile (11th century – 1479)
Kingdom of Navarre
Kingdom of the Suebi (409–585)
Visigothic Kingdom (418–711)
Vandalic and Alanic kingdoms in Iberia
Moorish Al Andalus
Caliphate of Cordoba, originally an emirate
Taifa kingdoms, mainly emirates
Albarracín
Algeciras
Almería
Alpuente
Badajoz
Baeza
Balearic Islands or Majorca
Beja and Évora
Carmona
Constantina and Hornachuelos
Cordova
Denia
Granada
Guadix and Baza
Huelva
Jaen
Jérica
Lisbon
Lorca
Malaga
Menorca
Mértola
Molina
Morón
Murcia
Murviedro and Sagunto
Niebla
Orihuela
Purchena
Ronda
Saltés and Huelva
Algarve
Santarém
Segorbe
Segura
Seville
Silves
Tavira
Tejada
Toledo
Tortosa
Valencia
Zaragoza

Italy
in present Italy
Roman states
Roman monarchy (787–525 BC)
Roman Republic (525–27 BC)
Roman Empire (27 BC-476 AD)
Post-Roman Kingdom of Italy
Republic of Venice (727–1797)
Republic of Genoa (~1000–1797)
Carantania
Duchy of Lucca
Duchy of Modena and Reggio
Duchy of Parma
Kingdom of Sardinia-Piedmont
Duchy (first Countship) of Savoy (1416–1714)
Kingdoms of Naples and Sicily (1043–1410, 1442–1500, 1735–1816)
Kingdom of the Two Sicilies (1816–1860)
Tuscany
Papal States – partially annexed by the kingdom of Italy in 1860, completely annexed in 1870
and many minor city states and feudal principalities
in present Sicily
Etruscan civilization
Roman Republic
Roman Empire
Western Roman Empire
Ostrogoths
Byzantine Empire
Emirate of Cordoba

Russia and Ukraine

In and around present-day European Russia and Ukraine:
Volga Bulgaria (660–1236)
Novgorod Republic
Golden Horde – in 1430s into Kazan Khanate, Crimean Khanate, Astrakhan Khanate, Siberia Khanate, Big Horde; Russia finally became independent
Khazar Empire (652–1016)
Kievan Rus (860 – 12th century)
Trubczewsk – Originally a sub-principality under Novhorod-Siversky, Trubchevsk was independent sporadically throughout the Middle Ages, in 1164–1196, 1202–1211, 1212–1240, 1378–1399, and finally in 1462–1503.
Grand Duchy of Lithuania (−1795)

Balkans
:Category:Former countries in the Balkans
Balkan states
Principality of Arbër (1190–1255)
Republic of Ragusa/Dubrovnik (1358–1808)
Medieval Croatian state (~800s–1102)
Great Bulgaria (632–660)
First Bulgarian Empire (681–1018)
Second Bulgarian Empire (1186–1396)
Bulgarian Khanate (681–864)
Lordship of Zeta
Byzantine Empire (330–1453)
Empire of Nicaea (1204–1261)
Empire of Trebizond
Despotate of Epirus
Despotate of Morea
European Crusader States (1098–1291)
Latin Empire of Constantinople
Kingdom of Thessalonica
Principality of Achaea
Duchy of Athens
Duchy of the Archipelago
Serbian Principality (7th century-c. 960)
Grand Principality of Duklja (1043–1101)
Serbian Grand Principality (1101–1217)
Serbian Kingdom (1217–1345),
Serbian Empire (1345–1371),

Middle East
Sultanate of Rum (1077–1307)
Armenian Kingdom of Cilicia (1080–1375)
Crusader States (1098–1291)
Countship of Edessa
Kingdom of Jerusalem
Principality of Antioch
Countship of Tripoli
Kingdom of Cyprus
Khwarezmian Empire (1077–1220)
Mongol Empire established in 1206, split in 1260s, though some of its successor states lasted for a few centuries
Great Seljuq Empire
Timurid Empire Persia, Central Asia, and part of India
Empire of Trebizond (1204–1461)
Uyunid Emirate (1076–1253)
Ottoman Empire (1299–1923)

Other
 Icelandic Commonwealth (930–1262)
  kingdom of Hungary (1000–1918)
 kingdom of Poland (1025–1385 )

Caucuses

Crimean Khanate (1441–1783)
Dzungar (1634–1757)

North Africa
 Kingdom of Egypt, (3100-1550BC), Early Dynastic, 1st, 2nd Intermediate, Middle Kingdom periods.
 Egyptian Empire (1550-1069BC), New Kingdom period.
 Kingdom of Egypt (1069-332BC), 3rd Intermediate and Late period.
 Kingdom of Carthage, (814-650BC)
 Carthaginian Empire, (650-146BC)
 Fatimid Caliphate (909–1171) in North Africa
 Sanhaja
 Mauretania 3rd century BC–431 AD, 533–698

Asia

South Asia
Indus Valley civilisation (Harappa, Mohenjo Daro (3100–1200 BC)
Janapadas (c. 1200 – 6th century BC)
Mahajanapadas (600-300 bc)
Magadha
Nanda Empire
Maurya Empire
Shunga Empire
Kanva Empire
Mahameghavana dynasty
Kuninda Kingdom
Indo Scythian Kingdom
Chera dynasty (c. 5th century BC–1102 AD)
Pandyan Kingdom
Chola Empire, which spread to Malaya, Indonesia, Ceylon (300s BC–1279)
Satavahana Empire
Indo-Greek Kingdom
Indo-Parthian Kingdom
Western Satraps
Kushan Empire
Indo-Sassanid Kingdom
Kalabhras Kingdom
Gupta Empire
Pallava dynasty
Kadamba dynasty
Western Ganga dynasty
Vishnukundina
Huna Kingdom
Chalukya dynasty
Harsha
Eastern Chalukyas
Pratihara Empire
Pala Empire
Rashtrakuta dynasty
Paramara dynasty
Yadava Kingdom
Chaulukya kingdom
Western Chalukya Empire
Hoysala Empire
Sena dynasty
Eastern Ganga dynasty
Kakatiya dynasty
Kalachuri
Muslim Sultanates
 Delhi Sultanate
Ahom Kingdom
Vijayanagara Empire
Kingdom of Mysore (1399–1947)
Madurai
Thanjavur Nayak kingdom
Maratha Empire
Sikh Empire (1799–1849)
Mughal Empire (1526–1857)

China
Shang dynasty
Zhou dynasty
Warring States
Chu
Cai
Cao
Chen
Lu
Song
Yue
Wu
Jin
Han
Zheng
Wei
Zhao
Qi
Yan
Qin
Qin dynasty
Han dynasty
Three Kingdoms
Eastern Wu
Cao Wei
Shu Han
Jin dynasty
Sixteen Kingdoms
Cheng Han
Former Liang
Former Qin
Former Yan
Han Zhao
Later Liang
Later Qin
Later Yan
Later Zhao
Northern Liang
Northern Yan
Southern Liang
Southern Yan
Western Liang
Western Qin
Xia
Southern and Northern dynasties
Liu Song
Northern Wei
Southern Qi
Eastern Wei
Liang dynasty
Western Wei
Chen
Northern Qi
Northern Zhou
Sui dynasty
Tang dynasty
Five Dynasties and Ten Kingdoms
Later Liang
Later Tang
Later Jin
Later Han
Later Zhou
Wu
Wuyue
Min
Chu
Southern Han
Former Shu
Later Shu
Jingnan
Southern Tang
Northern Han
Song dynasty
Yuan dynasty
Ming dynasty
Qing dynasty

The many Chinese states had an influence on surrounding regions; from the Song dynasty period alone, this includes:
Liao dynasty (Khitan ethnicity)
Western Xia (Tangut ethnicity)
Jin dynasty (Jurchen ethnicity)

A number of now-extinct states formed under Chinese influence along the Silk Road in the Tarim Basin, including:
Karasahr
Khotan
Kucha
Yarkand

Unsorted:
Tibetan Empire (7th to the 11th century)
Nanzhao (737–902)
Kingdom of Dali (937–1253)
Guge (c. 900-c. 1650)

Korea
The early history of Korea was as complex as that of neighbouring China. A number of Korean states existed on the peninsula and reached up into Manchuria before the formation of the modern state of Korea. These included:

Gojoseon
Proto Three Kingdoms
Buyeo
Okjeo
Dongye
Jin
Samhan (Ma, Byeon, Jin)
Three Kingdoms
Goguryeo
Baekje
Silla
Gaya Confederacy
North South States
Balhae
Unified Silla
Later Three Kingdoms
Taebong
Hubaekje
Silla
Goryeo
Joseon
Korean Empire

Japan
Republic of Ezo
Ryukyu Kingdom

Philippines
Sultanate of Maguindanao
Kingdom of Tondo
Kingdom of Maynila
Kingdom of Namayan

Vietnam
The country of Vietnam in the past was very different from the present. The first Vietnamese kingdom occupied only present-day northern Vietnam. In the 10th century, Vietnam began to push to the south for the next 1000 years, which was called Nam Tiến (southward expansion) in Vietnamese. It conquered other kingdoms and was split by civil war. All the kingdoms that united to form Vietnam are:

Annam (Chinese province)
Annam (French protectorate)
Âu Lạc
Champa
Amaravati (Champa)
Kauthara
Panduranga (Champa)
Vijaya (Champa)
Cochinchina
Funan
Kampuchea Krom
Nam Việt
North Vietnam
Sedang
South Vietnam
Tonkin
Vạn Xuân
Văn Lang

Cambodia/Laos/Thailand
Khmer Empire (Cambodian Empire) 802–1431
Chenla
Shambhupura
Óc Eo
Langkasuka
Sukhothai kingdom
Tambralinga
Patani Kingdom
Lanna
Dvaravati
Raktamaritika
Hariphunchai

Burma

Pyu city-states (c. 100 BC–c. 840 AD)
Mon kingdoms (9th–11th, 13th–16th, 18th centuries)
Singhanavati

Malaya/Indonesia
Pasai
Gangga Negara
Pan Pan
Tarumanagara
Sultanate of Aceh
Sultanate of Demak
Majapahit
Mataram Kingdom
Sunda Kingdom
Melayu Kingdom
Singhasari
Kediri (historical kingdom)
Malacca Sultanate
Pala Empire
Singhasari
Srivijaya
Johor Sultanate
Federation of Malaya
Kingdom of Pajang
Sultanate of Sulu and North Borneo – Sulu is now included in the Philippines, while North Borneo is now the Malaysian State of Sabah

Pre-Columbian America
The Americas have historically been home to a number of indigenous states, civilizations and societies of great complexity. Those indigenous states that still existed by the time of the first permanent European colonizations, from the late 15th century onwards, were soon substantively destroyed and/or absorbed. The list below includes both those that ceased to exist before this European arrival, and those that ceased to independently function because of this impact.
Ancestral Puebloans (Anasazi)
Aztec Empire
Cahokia
Carib
Chachapoya
Chimú
Ciboney
Huari (Wari)
Inca civilization
Tiwanaku
Maya civilization
Moche (Mochica)
Nazca (Ica-Nazca)
Olmec
Selk’nam
Taino
Timucuan
Teotihuacan Empire
Tlaxcala
Toltecs
Tahuantinsuyu (the Inca Empire)

In addition, there were a wide variety of pre-Inca cultures, few of which developed into organised states.

Oceania
Tu'i Tonga Empire
Kingdom of Hawaii
Kingdom of Tahiti
Kingdom of Bora Bora
 See List of Indigenous Australian group names  for a list of territories that have ceased to exist as political entities, grouped geographically and by constitutional nature.  See List of iwi  for a similar list of New Zealand Māori tribal divisions.

See also
 List of Bronze Age states (c. 3300–1200 BC)
 List of Iron Age states (c. 1200–600 BC)
 List of Classical Age states (c. 600 BC-200 AD)
 List of states during Late Antiquity (c. 200–700)
 List of states during the Middle Ages (c. 700–1500)
 List of former sovereign states
 Former countries in Europe after 1815
 List of countries
 List of former national capitals
 List of largest empires
 List of micronations

References

Lists of former countries